The 2012 World Junior Ice Hockey Championship Division III tournament was played in Dunedin, New Zealand, between 17 and 22 January 2012. This year, only the first-placed team advanced to Division II B for 2013, previously, the top two teams gained promotion to Division II. Although originally scheduled to participate, North Korea withdrew from the tournament for unspecified reasons. Iceland won the tournament and was promoted to Division II B for the 2013 World Juniors.

Participants

Final standings

Results
All times are local. (New Zealand Daylight Time – UTC+13)

Statistics

Top 10 scorers

Goaltending leaders 
(minimum 40% team's total ice time)

Awards

IIHF Best Player Awards
The following players were selected as the best at their position by the IIHF directorate:
 Goaltender:  Xia Shengrong
 Defenceman:  Ingolfur Eliasson
 Forward:  Zhang Cheng

Division III Champion

References

External links
IIHF.com

III
World Junior Ice Hockey Championships – Division III
International ice hockey competitions hosted by New Zealand
2012 in New Zealand sport